GeoBar 3 is the third local season of the reality show The Bar in Georgia.

Synopsis

Start Date: 15 October 2006.
End Date: 30 December 2006.
Duration: 77 days.
Contestants:
The Finalists: Irakli (Winner) & Sopho (Runner-up).
Evicted Contestants: Berdzena, Eto, Ia, Kosta, Melori, Neliko, Vano, Izolda, Veko & Vlasi.
Ejected: Sophia.

Note: Vano & Izolda are a couple who are competing as 1 single contestant.

Contestants

Nominations

2006 television seasons